The Sevenmile River or Seven Mile River is a river which flows through U.S. states of Massachusetts and Rhode Island.

Course
The river begins in Plainville, Massachusetts at an unnamed pond along Peck Road, near the town line with North Attleborough. From its source, it flows roughly due south through North Attleborough and Attleborough, then into Pawtucket, Rhode Island where it flows into the Ten Mile River.

Crossings
Below is a list of all crossings over the Sevenmile River. The list starts at the headwaters and goes downstream.
North Attleborough
High Street
Metcalf Road
Hoppin Hill Avenue (MA 120)
South Washington Street (U.S. 1)
Draper Avenue
Interstate 295
Old Post Road
Attleboro
West Street (MA 123)
Read Street
Roy Avenue
Pitas Avenue
Interstate 95
County Street

Tributaries
Hoppin Hill Brook
Four Mile Brook
Two Mile Brook
Tannery River
Sweedens Swamp Brook

See also
List of rivers in Massachusetts
List of rivers in Rhode Island
Ten Mile River (Seekonk River)

References

Maps from the United States Geological Survey

Rivers of Norfolk County, Massachusetts
Rivers of Bristol County, Massachusetts
Rivers of Providence County, Rhode Island
Rivers of Massachusetts
Rivers of Rhode Island
Tributaries of Providence River